The 1963/64 NTFL season was the 43rd season of the Northern Territory Football League (NTFL).

Buffaloes have won there 14th premiership title while defeating St Marys in the grand final by 23 points.

Grand Final

References 

Northern Territory Football League seasons
NTFL